Maramagambo Forest is located in Bushenyi, Uganda. It adjoins the Queen Elizabeth National Park to the north. It is jointly managed by the Uganda Wildlife Authority and the National Forestry Authority. It is associated with its bat cave where a tourist from the Netherlands was exposed to Marburg virus present in the bats that live in the volcanic tube cave and developed Marburg virus disease. Following this outbreak, the cave was closed until the construction of a viewing platform with support from the U.S. Centers for Disease Control and Prevention.  The forest is bordered by two crater lakes named Lake Kyasanduka and Lake Nyamasingiri. Many chimpanzees, red-tailed monkeys and Bates's pygmy antelopes can be found here.

Wildlife 
A medium - altitude rain forest, Maramagambo supports a rich selection of birds, along with forest mammals, including a  population of at least 300 chimpanzees, several types of monkey, and the likes of potto, giant forest hog, and yellow-backed duiker.

References

Bushenyi District
Forests of Uganda